Octavian Iosim (born 5 September 1930 – 1988) was a Romanian water polo player. He competed in the men's tournament at the 1952 Summer Olympics.

References

1930 births
1988 deaths
Romanian male water polo players
Olympic water polo players of Romania
Water polo players at the 1952 Summer Olympics
Jewish Romanian sportspeople
Place of birth missing